The 2006–07 GMHL season was the first season of the Greater Metro Junior A Hockey League (GMHL). The seven teams of the GMHL played 42-game schedules.

In February 2007, the top teams of the league played down for the Russell Cup, emblematic of the grand championship of the GMHL.  Since the GMHL is independent from Hockey Canada and the Canadian Junior Hockey League, the GMHL formed an alliance with the WHA Junior Hockey League of British Columbia under the name National Junior Hockey Alliance.  At the end of the league playoffs, the WHA champion was invited to a 3-game series hosted by the GMHL champion.  The Bradford Rattlers won the Russell Cup 4-games-to-1 over the King Wild and the Alliance Cup 3-games-to-none over the New Westminster Whalers.

Changes 
GMHL is formed.
Founding teams are: Bradford Rattlers, Deseronto Thunder, King Wild, Nipissing Alouettes, Richmond Hill Rams, South Muskoka Shield, and Toronto Canada Moose.
National Junior Hockey Alliance is formed for one season with WHA Junior Hockey League.

Final standings
Note: GP = Games played; W = Wins; L = Losses; OTL = Overtime Losses; SL = Shootout Losses; GF = Goals For.

Teams listed on the official league website.

Standings listed on official league website.

2006-07 Russell Cup Playoffs

Playoff results are listed on the official league website.

Alliance Cup
The National Junior Hockey Alliance championship between the WHA Junior Hockey League champion New Westminster Whalers and the GMHL champion Bradford Rattlers was hosted by the Rattlers in Bradford, Ontario.  Although a best-of-3 series, the third game was played as a friendly, although Bradford won the first two games.

Game 1: 03/30/07 - New Westminster 1 @ Bradford 6
Game 2: 03/31/07 - New Westminster 6 @ Bradford 8
Game 3: 04/01/07 - New Westminster 5 @ Bradford 6 (SO)

Scoring leaders 
Note: GP = Games played; G = Goals; A = Assists; Pts = Points; PIM = Penalty Minutes

Leading goaltenders 
Note: GP = Games played; Mins = Minutes Played; W = Wins; L = Losses: OTL = Overtime Losses; SL = Shootout Losses; GA = Goals Allowed; SO = Shutouts; GAA = Goals Against Average

Awards
Most Valuable Player - Karl Linden (Bradford Rattlers)
Top Scorer - Craig Peacock (Richmond Hill Rams)
Top Defenceman - Karl Linden (Bradford Rattlers)
Top Goaltender - Andreas Goetz (Bradford Rattlers)
Top Forward - Jordan Gidaro (King Wild)
Most Heart - Ryan Henely (Nipissing Alouettes)
Most Sportsmanlike Player - Brad Clark (Deseronto Thunder)
Top Defensive Forward - Jake Gilbert (Nipissing Alouettes)
Coach of the Year - Jenya Feldman (Bradford Rattlers)
Official of the Year - John Klien

See also 
 2006 in ice hockey
 2007 in ice hockey

References

External links 
 Official website of the Greater Metro Junior A Hockey League

Greater Metro Junior A Hockey League seasons
GMHL